Andrea Ferrari (13 August 1850 – 2 February 1921) – later adopting the middle name "Carlo" – was an Italian Catholic prelate who served as a cardinal and as the Archbishop of Milan from 1894 until his death. Ferrari was a well-regarded pastor and theologian who led two dioceses before being appointed to the prestigious Milanese archdiocese which he led until his death. But he was later accused of Modernism which led to a strained relationship with Pope Pius X who finally reconciled with Ferrari in 1912.

The cause for his canonization opened after his death in 1963 and he became titled as a Servant of God. He was named Venerable in 1975, and Pope John Paul II beatified him in 1987.

Life

Education and priesthood

Andrea Ferrari was born on 13 August 1850 in Lalatta (now Palanzano) in the Parma province as the eldest of four children to the shoemaker Giuseppe Ferrari and Maddalena Longarini; his baptism was celebrated on 14 August. His two paternal uncles Abbondio and Pietro were priests serving in Parma. He received his First Communion in 1860 from Father Giovanni Agostini and received his Confirmation in 1866.

He felt called to serve as a priest and was educated in Parma where he was to obtain a doctorate in theological studies in 1883. Ferrari received the first two minor orders on 18 September 1869 and the other two on 23 September 1871. He received the subdiaconate on 21 September 1872 and the diaconate on 15 December 1872. He was ordained to the priesthood on 20 December 1873 for the Diocese of Parma where he served from 1874 until 1890. He also served as the archpriest of Fornovo di Taro from 1874 until 1875 when he was made the vicar curate for the San Leonardo church.

Ferrari served as the Vice-Rector for seminarians in Parma and served also as a professor of mathematics and natural sciences in 1875 and later became its rector in 1877. He served also as a professor of theological fundamentals and ecclesial historical sciences as well as educating them in moral theological subjects in 1878. It was later that he published the "Summula theologiae dogmaticae generalis" in 1885 which proved to be a respected work in the field at that time and it was reprinted several times.

Episcopate
In mid-1890 he was appointed as the Bishop of Guastalla and he received his episcopal consecration as a bishop on 29 June 1890 from Cardinal Lucido Parocchi in the church of the Sacred Heart of Jesus in Villa Lante. The co-consecrators were Vincenzo Leone Sallua and Giovanni Maria Majoli. He took possession of his new diocese on 3 October 1890 and was later transferred to the Diocese of Como in mid-1891 after a brief tenure in Guastalla. In Como he was noted for his dedication to the people and made several pastoral visits to see all his parishes. In 1894 the newspaper Corriere della Sera noted his "meticulous visits" as proper diocesan management and attentiveness while noting that "he talks well with a good voice". In 1893 he supported the appointment of Giuseppe Melchiorre Sarto – future Pope Pius X – as Patriarch of Venice and was successful in securing the appointment.

Cardinalate
Ferrari was elevated to the cardinalate in 1894 and Pope Leo XIII named him as the Cardinal-Priest of Santa Anastasia (the title and red hat were conferred a week after the elevation). It was just a week after his elevation that he was transferred to the Archdiocese of Milan and was granted the pallium prior to his departure; he also took Carlo as a middle name in honour of Charles Borromeo who was a predecessor during the Counter-Reformation period. His private assistant while in Milan was Father Giovanni Rossi. Ferrari was a strong supporter and promoter of Rerum Novarum and espoused the core themes of social justice that the pope highlighted in that document. He also enlisted the aid of Giuseppe Toniolo to promote it and make it a theme of his professorship.

His main mission in Milan was to preserve the faith of the people through catechesis and he made four pastoral visits as archbishop. He pushed for the publication of the Catechism of Pius X in Milan as a step towards this aim. He also visited all parishes in his archdiocese and was attentive to the social circumstances of each parish. In addition Ferrari held several episcopal conferences to discuss matters of ecclesial life. In 1895 he held the Archdiocesan Eucharistic Congress from 1–5 September 1895.

Ferrari participated in the papal conclave in 1903 that elected Pope Pius X, and had been considered to be "papabile" for his pastoral qualities. Ferrari petitioned the cardinals to support a pastoral candidate to become pope and began casting his votes for his old colleague Sarto. He tried to persuade Sarto to accept the election if chosen though the latter insisted that he should not be voted for and that he would not accept. But Ferrari insisted that the refusal could become harmful for the Church and painful for Sarto for the remainder of his life. But Francesco Satolli convinced Sarto of the ramifications of his refusal which prompted Sarto's acceptance of the pontificate. Ferrari returned to Milan on 10 August and that month travelled to Cologne to meet with its archbishop Cardinal Anton Hubert Fischer.

In 1908 he was in London at Westminster for the nineteenth Eucharistic Congress held from 9–13 September. In 1910 he organized festivities for the third centennial of the canonization of Charles Borromeo. In 1918 he founded the Women's Youth for Azione Cattolica and entrusted its direction to Armida Barelli. During World War I he formed a group that was dedicated to caring for soldiers and prisoners and was awarded in 1919 with the Grand Cross of the Order of Saints Maurizio and Lazzaro for his efforts.

Ferrari was accused of "Modernism" in 1907 which was an accusation that Pope Pius X had accepted. He was no Modernist and denounced them in a pastoral letter he issued in 1908. Despite this the accusations put him in a negative position with Rome and he decided to keep quiet so as not to attract the ire of Pius X. He had been accused of excessive liberalism and defended his archdiocese against misunderstandings that Rome held though this prompted a 1911 canonical investigation. In 1912 the pope realized the mistake he had made and received the cardinal after this matter was resolved for a reconciliation. In 1912 he promoted the establishment of the newspaper L'Italia which replaced L'Unione. He also partook in the conclave in 1914 that elected Pope Benedict XV. Ferrari was on good terms with Angelo Giuseppe Roncalli – the future Pope John XXIII. The two knew the other well and Roncalli was the one who celebrated his funeral. He was also close with Achille Ratti who was his successor in Milan and the future Pope Pius XI. Ferrari ordained as priests the future cardinals Camillo Caccia Dominioni (1899) and Carlo Confalonieri (1916) in addition to Bishop Giorgio Giovanni Elli (1903) and Archbishop Mario Giardini (1904).

Death
Ferrari died in 1921 at 5:55pm after he finished the recitation of one of the rosaries he himself started due to throat cancer, and was buried in the archdiocesan cathedral under the Sacred Heart altar. The first sign of his ailment around 1918 was simple hoarseness, later diagnosed as throat cancer. His old friend Roncalli would refer to him later as an "authentic saint". In Legnano a church was constructed from 1987 to 1989 and dedicated to him. Cardinal Carlo Maria Martini consecrated the church in 1991.

Beatification

The Milanese came to revere Ferrari for his strong holiness and his old friend Pope John XXIII opened his cause for canonization on 10 February 1963. This came after his Milanese successor Alfredo Ildefonso Schuster opened the informative phase of investigation for his beatification in 1951. Pope Paul VI (another Milanese successor) proclaimed him to be Venerable on 1 February 1975 in recognition of his life of heroic virtue. Pope John Paul II beatified Ferrari on 10 May 1987 in Saint Peter's Square.

The current postulator for this cause is the Franciscan priest Giovangiuseppe Califano.

References

External links
 Hagiography Circle
 Catholic Online
 Catholic Hierarchy
 

1850 births
1921 deaths
20th-century Italian cardinals
19th-century Italian Roman Catholic archbishops
19th-century venerated Christians
20th-century Italian Roman Catholic archbishops
20th-century venerated Christians
Archbishops of Milan
Beatifications by Pope John Paul II
Bishops of Como
Burials at Milan Cathedral
Deaths from cancer in Lombardy
Deaths from laryngeal cancer
Italian beatified people
Cardinals created by Pope Leo XIII
19th-century Italian Roman Catholic theologians
Knights Grand Cross of the Order of Saints Maurice and Lazarus
Members of the Order of the Holy Sepulchre
Clergy from the Province of Parma
Venerated Catholics
20th-century Italian Roman Catholic theologians
Fellows of the American Physical Society